Claudia Florentino Vivó (born 10 March 1998) is a Spanish professional footballer who plays as a centre back for Primera División club Real Madrid CF.

Club career
Florentino started her senior career with Valencia. In April 2022, she renewed her contract with Real Madrid until 2023.

References

External links
 Profile at Real Madrid

 

1998 births
Living people
Women's association football defenders
Spanish women's footballers
Valencia CF Femenino players
Fundación Albacete players
Real Madrid Femenino players
Footballers from Valencia (city)
Primera División (women) players
Segunda Federación (women) players